The 1912 New South Wales Rugby Football League premiership was the fifth season of Sydney’s rugby league club competition, Australia’s first. Eight teams from across the city contested during the season for the premiership and the Royal Agricultural Society Challenge Shield.

Season summary
From 1912 to 1925, the team finishing on top of the ladder after the home-and-away rounds was automatically deemed premiers unless two clubs were on equal points at this point in which case a final was held. This move by the New South Wales Rugby League may well have been in response to Eastern Suburbs’ victory in the season before, where they overcame minor premiers Glebe in two successive finals to claim the premiership.

With four rounds remaining in the 1912 season, Eastern Suburbs and Glebe were clearly ahead of the rest of the teams and it looked unlikely that they would be caught. The two clubs were matched up against each other in Round 11 at the Sydney Sports Ground in what would ultimately decide the fate of the premiership, with Glebe just two points behind Eastern Suburbs on the ladder. In front of 25,000 people, the two clubs played out a closely fought match in muddy conditions. Dally Messenger was able to break a 4–4 deadlock late in the match by kicking a field goal after a scrum win close to the sideline and win the game 6–4 for Eastern Suburbs.

With a four-point premiership lead and only three rounds to play, Eastern Suburbs, who had only lost one game before in the season to eventual third-placed Newtown, looked uncatchable. That turned out to be the case, with Eastern Suburbs winning their remaining three games to take away the premiership.

Also this season Pratten Park became the Western Suburbs club’s homeground.

Teams
The teams remained unchanged from the previous season.
 Annandale
 Balmain, formed on 23 January 1908 at Balmain Town Hall
 Eastern Suburbs, formed on 24 January 1908 at Paddington Town Hall
 Glebe, formed on 9 January 1908
 Newtown, formed on 14 January 1908
 North Sydney, formed on February 7, 1908, at the North Sydney School of Arts in Mount Street
 South Sydney, formed on 17 January 1908 at Redfern Town Hall
 Western Suburbs, formed on 4 February 1908

Ladder

Premiers
Eastern Suburbs won the premiership when they beat Norths at North Sydney Oval 15-10 on 17 August. The premiership squad was:

References

External links
 Rugby League Tables - Notes AFL Tables
 Rugby League Tables - Season 1912 AFL Tables
 Premiership History and Statistics RL1908
 1912 - Messenger Leads Easts To 2nd Title RL1908
 Results: 1911-20 at rabbitohs.com.au

New South Wales Rugby League premiership
NSWRFL Season